Madison County Courthouse Historic District is a national historic district located at Madison, Madison County, Virginia. The district encompasses 66 contributing buildings in the county seat of Madison.  In addition to the separately listed Madison County Courthouse, there are a variety of residential, commercial, and institutional buildings dating from the early 19th to the 20th century.  Notable buildings include the County Clerk's Office (1832), the Washington Tavern or Eagle House (ca. 1832), the Arcade (1830s), Piedmont Episcopal Church (1832-1834), the Madison Presbyterian and Methodist churches (1852-1853), Hunton House Hotel (1804, 1849), and the Linn Banks Masonic Lodge (1855).

It was listed on the National Register of Historic Places in 1984.

References

Buildings and structures in Madison County, Virginia
Historic districts in Northern Virginia
Historic districts on the National Register of Historic Places in Virginia
National Register of Historic Places in Madison County, Virginia
Courthouses on the National Register of Historic Places in Virginia